Major-General Fitzgerald Wintour  (1860—1949) was a British military officer who served in the Queen's Own Royal West Kent Regiment and the Royal Norfolk Regiment. Wintour was commissioned in the British Army in 1880 and fought in the Anglo-Egyptian War, the Mahdist War, the Tochi Expedition, the Second Boer War, and in World War I. He was made a Companion of the Order of the Bath and a Commander of the Order of the British Empire for his military service. Wintour was the father of newspaper editor Charles Wintour and of Cordelia James, Baroness James of Rusholme. He was the grandfather of Dame Anna Wintour and Patrick Wintour.

Early life and family 
Fitzgerald Wintour was born in 1860 to Rev. Fitzgerald Wintour and Isabel Milnes Gaskell. He was the grandson of Mary Wynn Williams-Wynn, the daughter of Charles Williams-Wynn, and Conservative politician James Milnes Gaskell of Thornes House, Wakefield, Yorkshire, and of Wenlock Abbey, Much Wenlock, Shropshire. His maternal great-grandfather was Sir Watkin Williams-Wynn, 4th Baronet and his great-great grandfather was British prime minister George Grenville. Wintour was the nephew of Liberal politician Charles Milnes Gaskell.

Military career 
Wintour was commissioned in the British Army on 11 August 1880. He was Adjutant of the 1st Battalion Royal West Kent from 1884 to 1889 and, in 1891, passed staff college at Staff College, Camberley.

In 1882, he fought in the Anglo-Egyptian War. From 1884 to 1886, Wintour served in the Queen's Own Royal West Kent Regiment during the Mahdist War, and was promoted to the rank of captain in 1887. In 1897, Wintour was sent to the North Western Frontier Province as part of the Tochi Expedition. In 1889, he went to South Africa to fight in the Second Boer War, and was promoted to the rank of major in 1900. He transferred to the Royal Norfolk Regiment in 1903 and was promoted to lieutenant colonel in 1904. He was made a colonel in 1908. Wintour was made a Companion of the Order of the Bath during the 1910 Birthday Honours.

During World War I, Wintour commanded a brigade, the Administration Scottish Command, in France from 1914 to 1915. Wintour was given command of the 84th Brigade, 28th Division on 25 December 1914. He was relieved of his command on 23 February 1915 after the brigade lost a hundred yards of trench during a raid by the Imperial German Army. Major-General Sir Edward Bulfin of the GOC 28th Division, visited Wintour's headquarters and told him that he was incapable of commanding a brigade in the field. Wintour was then sent to Casualty Clearing Station No.3, where he was diagnosed with neurasthenia and sent home. Wintour returned to the Western Front on 30 June 1915, serving as Deputy Assistant and Quartermaster General, until 9 November 1915.

He retired from the army in 1918. He was made a Commander of the Order of the British Empire in the 1919 New Year Honours.

Photocopies of memoirs from Wintour's time in service, including an account of the Tochi Valley expedition in 1897 and a complaint relating to conditions in the trenches on the Western Front of World War I from 1915, are housed in the Liddell Hart Centre for Military Archives at King's College London. The documents were donated by his family in 1990.

Personal life 
Wintour's first wife died in 1904. On 6 January 1912, he married a second time to Alice Jane Blanche Foster, sister of Sir Augustus Vere Foster, 4th Baronet, in Epping, Essex. His wife was the great-granddaughter of the novelist Lady Elizabeth Foster (later the Duchess of Devonshire) and the Irish politician John Thomas Foster and the great-great-granddaughter of Frederick Hervey, 4th Earl of Bristol, who served as the Anglican Bishop of Derry.

Wintour and Foster had two children, Cordelia Mary Wintour (later Baroness James of Rusholme) and Charles Vere Wintour CBE. He served as the witness at his son's wedding.

Wintour died in 1949.

He is the grandfather of Dame Anna Wintour and Patrick Wintour.

References 

1860 births
1949 deaths
Graduates of the Staff College, Camberley
British Army major generals
British Army personnel of the Anglo-Egyptian War
British Army personnel of the Mahdist War
British Army personnel of the Second Boer War
Commanders of the Order of the British Empire
Companions of the Order of the Bath
Graduates of the Royal Military College, Sandhurst
Quartermasters
Queen's Own Royal West Kent Regiment officers
Royal Norfolk Regiment officers
Fitzgerald
British Army generals of World War I